Harsimrat Kaur Badal (born 25 July 1966) is an Indian politician and a former Union Cabinet Minister of Food Processing Industries in the Government of India and Member of Parliament in the Lok Sabha from Bathinda. She is a member of Shiromani Akali Dal Party. Her husband Sukhbir Singh Badal is former deputy chief minister of Punjab and the president of Shiromani Akali Dal. She resigned from the cabinet on 17 September 2020 to protest against few farmer related ordinances and legislation.

Personal life
Badal was born on 25 July 1966 to Satyajit and Sukhmanjus Majithia in Delhi. She did her schooling from Loreto Convent School, Delhi. She is a matriculate and holds a diploma in textile design. She married Sukhbir Singh Badal on 21 November 1991. The couple have two daughters and a son. Her brother Bikram Singh Majithia is a member of Shiromani Akali Dal, a former MLA from Majitha and an ex minister in the Punjab state government led by her father-in-law Parkash Singh Badal.

Political career
Badal started her political career with the 2009 Indian general election. She was elected to the 15th Lok Sabha from the Bathinda constituency after defeating Indian National Congress candidate Raninder Singh by 120,960 votes. Her first speech was on 3 December 2009, where she expressed her concern about the victims and survivors of the 1984 anti-Sikh riots. She was part of a project named "Nanhi Chhan" to save girl child and trees. Badal has been re-elected as an MP from Bathinda in 2014 having defeated Indian National Congress-People's Party of Punjab joint candidate, Manpreet Singh Badal. For this, she was appointed in the Modi government as State Minister for Food Processing. She got elected for 3rd time in a row from Bathinda in 2019 Lok Sabha election. She defeated the Congress candidate Amrinder Singh Raja Warring in a close fight with around 21,000 votes.

In May 2019, she continued her Ministry of Food Processing Industries.

She resigned from the cabinet on 17 September 2020 to protest against the new farm bills passed by the government.

Business career 
Badal and her family have direct or indirect interests in any array of businesses. Members of the Badal family, including Harsimrat's father-in-law and husband have ownership interests in Orbit Resorts, Metro Eco Green Resorts, Saanjh Foundation, Falcon Properties, Dabwali Transport and Orbit Aviation. Her maternal family controls Saraya Industries, Ajnala Power, and Batala Power. Her husband holds a majority stake in the Punjabi language PTC television network.

Social work
In September 2008, Kaur started the "Nanhi Chhan" project to combat against female foeticide in Punjab, women empowerment and to save the trees. It operates in schools, colleges, gurudwaras, temples, churches, and municipal centers. Through this project many girls and women in Punjab villages have been trained in cloth sewing, knitting and flowering.

See also
 Punjab
 Shiromani Akali Dal
 Bathinda

References

|-

|-

External links
Official website of Harsimrat Badal

1966 births
Living people
India MPs 2009–2014
India MPs 2014–2019
Women in Punjab, India politics
Shiromani Akali Dal politicians
Indian Sikhs
Lok Sabha members from Punjab, India
People from Bathinda district
Narendra Modi ministry
21st-century Indian women politicians
21st-century Indian politicians
Women members of the Cabinet of India
India MPs 2019–present
Members of the Cabinet of India